In mathematics, a Hausdorff gap consists roughly of two collections of sequences of integers, such that there is no sequence lying between the two collections. The existence of Hausdorff gaps shows that the partially ordered set of possible growth rates of sequences is not complete.

Definition

Let  be the set of all sequences of non-negative integers, and define  to mean .

The transfinite sequence  is strictly increasing;
The transfinite sequence  is strictly decreasing;
Every element of the sequence  is less than every element of the sequence .

A pregap is called a gap if it satisfies the additional condition:

A Hausdorff gap is a -gap in  such that for every countable ordinal  and every natural number  there are only a finite number of  less than  such that for all  we have .

There are some variations of these definitions, with the ordered set  replaced by a similar set. For example, one can redefine  to mean  for all but finitely many .

Existence

References

External links

Descriptive set theory
Order theory
Integer sequences
General topology